AlalcomeneÏs (Ancient Greek:  means 'guardian') was an epithet of the Greek goddess Athena, the origin of which was subject to several theories.  Some derived it from the name of the hero Alalcomenes, or from the Boeotian village of Alalcomenae, where in some traditions she was said to have been born.  In or near that town there was a temple of Athena Alalcomeneis that was plundered by the Roman general Sulla in the early 1st century BC.  After he removed the temple's main icon, an ivory statue of the goddess, the place fell into disuse and disrepair.  In the early 19th century, William Martin Leake claimed ruins of the temple could still be seen.

Others derive the name from the Greek verb alalkein ("to protect") so that it would signify the "powerful defender".

Notes

References

 Graves, Robert, The Greek Myths, Harmondsworth, London, England, Penguin Books, 1960. 
Graves, Robert, The Greek Myths: The Complete and Definitive Edition. Penguin Books Limited. 2017. 
Homer, The Iliad with an English Translation by A.T. Murray, Ph.D. in two volumes. Cambridge, MA., Harvard University Press; London, William Heinemann, Ltd. 1924. . Online version at the Perseus Digital Library.
Homer, Homeri Opera in five volumes. Oxford, Oxford University Press. 1920. . Greek text available at the Perseus Digital Library.
 Pausanias, Description of Greece with an English Translation by W.H.S. Jones, Litt.D., and H.A. Ormerod, M.A., in 4 Volumes. Cambridge, MA, Harvard University Press; London, William Heinemann Ltd. 1918. . Online version at the Perseus Digital Library
Pausanias, Graeciae Descriptio. 3 vols. Leipzig, Teubner. 1903.  Greek text available at the Perseus Digital Library.
 Stephanus of Byzantium, Stephani Byzantii Ethnicorum quae supersunt, edited by August Meineike (1790-1870), published 1849. A few entries from this important ancient handbook of place names have been translated by Brady Kiesling. Online version at the Topos Text Project.
 Strabo, The Geography of Strabo. Edition by H.L. Jones. Cambridge, Mass.: Harvard University Press; London: William Heinemann, Ltd. 1924. Online version at the Perseus Digital Library.
 Strabo, Geographica edited by A. Meineke. Leipzig: Teubner. 1877. Greek text available at the Perseus Digital Library.

Epithets of Athena